The Tawûsgeran is a Yazidi religious festival.

Description
During the Tawûsgeran, Qewals and other religious dignitaries visit Yazidi villages, bringing the sinjaq, sacred images of a peacock symbolizing Tawûsê Melek. These are venerated, fees are collected from the pious, sermons are preached and holy water and berat (small stones from Lalish) distributed.

References

Yazidi holy days
Kurdish words and phrases